Chassé is a former commune in the Sarthe department in the Pays de la Loire region in north-western France. In 2015 it became part of Villeneuve-en-Perseigne. Its population was 177 in 2019.

See also
Communes of the Sarthe department

References

Former communes of Sarthe